The Dr Hendrik Muller Prize for Behavioural and Social Sciences is awarded every other year by the Royal Netherlands Academy of Arts and Sciences to a researcher or group of researchers who has made a significant or valuable contribution to the behavioural and social sciences. The award is named after Hendrik Pieter Nicolaas Muller (1859–1941), a Dutch businessman and diplomat.

Winners

Arend Lijphart (1991)
Willem Levelt (1993)
Willem Buiter (1995)
Wout Ultee (1997)
Piet Rietveld (1999)
Peter van der Veer (2001)
Peter Hagoort (2003)
Jan-Benedict Steenkamp (2005)
Michel Wedel (2005)
Marc Groenhuijsen (2007)
Dorret Boomsma (2009)
Patti Valkenburg (2011)
Marinus van IJzendoorn (2013)
Carsten de Dreu (2015)
Eveline Crone (2017)
Raf de Bont (2019)

See also

 List of social sciences awards

References

External links
Dr Hendrik Muller Prize Laureates

Social sciences awards
Dutch awards